The Missoula station in Missoula, Montana, was built by the Northern Pacific Railway in 1901. The current structure is the third depot built in Missoula by the Northern Pacific, which reached Missoula in 1883. It was listed on the National Register of Historic Places in 1985, as the Northern Pacific Railroad Depot.

History
The coming of the Northern Pacific Railway to Missoula ensured the town's economic prosperity as a major transportation hub in Western Montana. This depot was planned to be replaced in 1896, but the replacement depot was destroyed by arson before it was completed. The current depot, which was completed in 1901, was designed by architects Reed and Stem of St. Paul, Minnesota, in a simplified Renaissance Revival style of architecture. Reed and Stem designed over 100 railroad depots, including the Grand Central Terminal in New York City.

The depot is constructed of beige Roman brick that had been salvaged by Northern Pacific from the railroad's abandoned Olympian Hotel project in Tacoma, Washington, that would later be rebuilt as Stadium High School. Bricks from that hotel would also be used to construct a depot at Wallace, Idaho the same year. The Missoula depot features a main three-story structure flanked by one story wings on each side. The main structure is divided by brick columns into six bays, with the outer four columns on each side sporting the Northern Pacific black and red yin-yang logo. The wings are likewise divided into four bays. The main structure has a hipped roof with terra cotta tiles, while the wings feature flat roofs.

Passenger trains of the Northern Pacific stopped at the depot through 1971, when passenger service in the United States was taken over by Amtrak. Amtrak continued to provide service to Missoula with the North Coast Hiawatha until 1979. The tracks are now used for freight only, and are owned by Montana Rail Link.

The depot was placed on the National Register of Historic Places on March 28, 1985, and is considered to be the most prominent structure symbolizing the importance of the railroad in developing and transforming Missoula's economy.

Near the depot is the preserved Northern Pacific #1356 4-6-0 steam locomotive.

See also
National Register of Historic Places listings in Missoula County, Montana

References

External links

Missoula, Montana – TrainWeb

Railway stations on the National Register of Historic Places in Montana
Railway stations in the United States opened in 1901
Former Amtrak stations in Montana
Former Northern Pacific Railway stations
National Register of Historic Places in Missoula, Montana
Reed and Stem buildings
Railway stations closed in 1979
Transportation in Missoula County, Montana
1901 establishments in Montana
Renaissance Revival architecture in Montana